Stanimir Mitev (born 25 October 1985) is a Bulgarian footballer who currently plays as a midfielder for Chernomorets Burgas.

Career
Mitev began his career with FC Chernomorets Burgas and played for the club in the A PFG during the 2002–04 season.

References

External links
 

1985 births
Living people
Bulgarian footballers
FC Chernomorets Burgas players
PFC Nesebar players
FC Pomorie players
Neftochimic Burgas players
FC Sozopol players
First Professional Football League (Bulgaria) players
Association football midfielders